Rockville is a city in Bates County, Missouri, and is part of the Kansas City metropolitan area within the United States. The population was 135 at the 2020 census.

History
Rockville was laid out in 1868. The city was named from local white sandstone quarries. A post office called Rockville has been in operation since 1871.

Geography
Rockville is located at  (38.070435, -94.080404).

The community is in the southeast corner of Bates County approximately 18 miles southeast of Butler and on the north shore of the Harry S Truman Reservoir. Schell City is across the lake and four miles to the southwest in adjacent Vernon County.

Demographics

2010 census
As of the census of 2010, there were 166 people, 72 households, and 38 families living in the city. The racial makeup of the city was 95.8% White, 0.6% African American, 0.6% Asian, and 3.0% from two or more races. Hispanic or Latino of any race were 2.4% of the population.

There were 72 households, of which 27.8% had children under the age of 18 living with them, 40.3% were married couples living together, 8.3% had a female householder with no husband present, 4.2% had a male householder with no wife present, and 47.2% were non-families. 38.9% of all households were made up of individuals, and 20.8% had someone living alone who was 65 years of age or older. The average household size was 2.31 and the average family size was 3.21.

The median age in the city was 45 years. 23.5% of residents were under the age of 18; 7.1% were between the ages of 18 and 24; 19.2% were from 25 to 44; 33.6% were from 45 to 64; and 16.3% were 65 years of age or older. The gender makeup of the city was 48.8% male and 51.2% female.

2000 census
As of the census of 2000, there were 162 people, 77 households, and 39 families living in the city. The population density was 504.8 people per square mile (195.5/km). There were 103 housing units at an average density of 320.9 per square mile (124.3/km). The racial makeup of the city was 97.53% White, 0.62% African American, and 1.85% from two or more races. Hispanic or Latino of any race were 1.85% of the population.

There were 77 households, out of which 20.8% had children under the age of 18 living with them, 37.7% were married couples living together, 7.8% had a female householder with no husband present, and 48.1% were non-families. 41.6% of all households were made up of individuals, and 23.4% had someone living alone who was 65 years of age or older. The average household size was 2.10 and the average family size was 2.83.

In the city the population was spread out, with 19.8% under the age of 18, 5.6% from 18 to 24, 24.1% from 25 to 44, 27.2% from 45 to 64, and 23.5% who were 65 years of age or older. The median age was 46 years. For every 100 females, there were 100.0 males. For every 100 females age 18 and over, there were 106.3 males.

The median income for a household in the city was $19,219, and the median income for a family was $21,250. Males had a median income of $29,583 versus $11,786 for females. The per capita income for the city was $12,730. About 33.3% of families and 32.1% of the population were below the poverty line, including 59.3% of those under the age of eighteen and 16.7% of those 65 or over.

References

External links
 Historic maps of Rockville in the Sanborn Maps of Missouri Collection at the University of Missouri

Cities in Bates County, Missouri
Populated places established in 1868
1868 establishments in Missouri
Cities in Missouri